Myrophis is a genus of eels in the snake eel family Ophichthidae.

Species
There are currently seven recognized species in this genus:
 Myrophis anterodorsalis McCosker, E. B. Böhlke & J. E. Böhlke, 1989 (longfin worm eel)
 Myrophis lepturus Kotthaus, 1968
 Myrophis microchir (Bleeker, 1864) (ordinary snake eel)
 Myrophis platyrhynchus Breder, 1927 (Broadnose worm-eel)
 Myrophis plumbeus (Cope, 1871) (Leaden worm-eel)
 Myrophis punctatus Lütken, 1852 (Speckled worm-eel)
 Myrophis vafer D. S. Jordan & C. H. Gilbert, 1883 (Pacific worm-eel)

Former Species
 Myrophis heterognathos (Bleeker, 1858) - valid as Gnathophis heterognathos

References

 
Ophichthidae